Anita Devi "Annet" Mahendru (born November 5, 1985) is an American actress. She is known for playing Nina Sergeevna Krilova on the FX period drama series The Americans (2013–2016), for which she garnered a nomination for the Critics' Choice Television Award for Best Supporting Actress in a Drama Series in 2014 and as Jennifer "Huck" Mallick in the AMC series The Walking Dead: World Beyond in 2020.

Early life and education
Mahendru was born on November 5, 1985, in Kabul, then in the DR Afghanistan. Her mother, Olga, is Russian, and her father, Ghanshan "Ken" Mahendru, is a Punjabi Hindu Indian educator and journalist with roots from Delhi, did his studies from Kabul University and later met her mother in Russia where he was working. The Mahendru family had moved to Afghanistan where her grandfather had a sweets business in Kabul and her grandmother originally hailed from Nepal. She had what she calls a "gypsy" childhood, spending her first seven years of her childhood between Afghanistan and Saint Petersburg. She then lived with her mother at Saint Petersburg and regularly travelled between there and Frankfurt, before moving with her father to East Meadow, New York, at age 13, after her parents separated.

Mahendru attended East Meadow High School, where she was active in competitive cheerleading and kick line teams; she graduated in 2004. She went on to earn an English degree from St. John's University in New York City.

Mahendru grew up speaking Persian, Russian, German, English, and also speaks conversational Hindi and French. She also uses Dari to speak with her relatives. She initially wanted to use what she has called her "ethnic ambiguity" to work for the United Nations. She was enrolled at New York University for a master's degree in international relations as she wanted to work for the women in Afghanistan, but dropped out to pursue acting. She then moved to Los Angeles and studied improv at The Groundlings.

Career
Mahendru began her acting career in 2006, appearing in an episode of the sitcom Love Monkey, an episode of the drama Conviction, a Law & Order spinoff, and the short film "The Art of Love". The following year, she appeared in an episode of the HBO comedy-drama Entourage. Her next significant roles came in 2011, in episodes of the sitcoms Big Time Rush and 2 Broke Girls. In 2012, she starred in an episode of the sitcom Mike & Molly.

In 2013, Mahendru began playing the recurring character Nina Sergeevna Krilova on the FX drama The Americans, appeared in an episode of the crime series White Collar, and played Agent Rosen in two episodes of the crime drama The Blacklist. She also starred in her first film, the fantasy horror Escape from Tomorrow, which drew attention because most of it was filmed on location at both Walt Disney World and Disneyland without permission from The Walt Disney Company, owner and operator of both parks.

In 2014, Mahendru was promoted to a series regular for the second season of The Americans. She also starred in the comedy-drama film Bridge and Tunnel, had a voice role in the 2014 animated film Penguins of Madagascar, and guest-starred in the 2016 X-Files miniseries as Sveta, a possible UFO abductee. She played Nafisa Al-Qadi on the FX series Tyrant.

Mahendru stars in the title role of the independent feature film Sally Pacholok (2015), which premiered at and won Best Feature at the DC Independent Film Festival, in Washington, DC.

Mahendru has also performed at theatre works at LATW. In 2017, she performed in Seven as an Afghan refugee and women's rights activist Farida Azizi at the LA Theatre Works. The play was a collaboration between 7 playwrights and female activists each from around the globe that portrays inspiring stories of overcoming adversities to bring about real change and improve the lives of women.

Mahendru stars in the seventh episode of the anthology series The Romanoffs, which began streaming on Amazon Video on November 16, 2018.

She plays a lead role as Jennifer "Huck" Mallick in the AMC series The Walking Dead: World Beyond, which premiered in 2020.

Personal life
Mahendru is married to Louie Gibson, an Australian writer and director and a son of Mel Gibson. The couple has a son born .

Despite both her parents' families not being from Afghanistan and having lived across the world since she was young, Mahendru maintains strong ties to her Indian and Russian roots as well as her connection to her birthplace, stating in 2022:

Filmography

Film

Television

Theatre

Awards and nominations

References

External links 
 
 
 

1985 births
Living people
21st-century American actresses
Actresses from New York (state)
Afghan emigrants to the United States
American actresses of Indian descent
American film actresses
American Hindus
American people of Russian descent
American stage actresses
American television actresses
East Meadow High School alumni
New York University alumni
People from East Meadow, New York
People from Kabul
St. John's University (New York City) alumni